Seila crocea is a species of minute sea snail, a marine gastropod mollusc or micromollusc in the family Cerithiopsidae.

References

Cerithiopsidae
Gastropods described in 1871